Keith Alexander Mitchell (born August 6, 1969 in San Diego, California) is an American former professional baseball player. He played parts of four seasons in Major League Baseball (MLB) for the Atlanta Braves, Seattle Mariners, Cincinnati Reds and Boston Red Sox. He also played in the KBO League for the Haitai Tigers.

Career
Mitchell was drafted by the Braves in the 4th round of the 1987 MLB draft. He debuted with the Braves on July 23, 1991 and went on to hit .318 in 48 games that season, but that was his last shot at the bigs with Atlanta. He did, however, earn some playing time as the left fielder for the Braves in that year's postseason.

All his stints in the MLB were short and far apart from one another. In 1994, he played in 46 games with the Mariners and in 1996, he played in 11 games with the Reds. His MLB career ended 2 years later in 1998 after playing 23 games with the Red Sox. He also was the third out in John Valentin's unassisted triple play on July 8, 1994.

In 128 games over four seasons, Mitchell posted a .260 batting average (63-for-242) with 38 runs, 8 home runs and 29 RBI.

In 2005, Mitchell was named the hitting coach of the Swing of the Quad Cities, a minor league affiliate of the St. Louis Cardinals.  2006-07, Mitchell served as the Quad Cities' manager. In 2008, he was the hitting coach of the Palm Beach Cardinals.

Personal life
He is a cousin of Kevin Mitchell.

References

External links

Career statistics and player information from Korea Baseball Organization

1969 births
Living people
African-American baseball coaches
African-American baseball managers
African-American baseball players
American expatriate baseball players in Canada
American expatriate baseball players in Mexico
American expatriate baseball players in South Korea
Atlanta Braves players
Baseball coaches from California
Baseball players from San Diego
Boston Red Sox players
Burlington Braves players
Calgary Cannons players
Chattanooga Lookouts players
Cincinnati Reds players
Durham Bulls players
Greenville Braves players
Gulf Coast Braves players
Haitai Tigers players
Indianapolis Indians players
KBO League outfielders
Louisville Bats players
Major League Baseball outfielders
Mexican League baseball first basemen
Mexican League baseball right fielders
Minor league baseball coaches
Minor league baseball managers
Olmecas de Tabasco players
Pawtucket Red Sox players
Richmond Braves players
Seattle Mariners players
Sioux Falls Canaries players
Sonoma County Crushers players
Sumter Braves players
Trenton Thunder players
21st-century African-American people
20th-century African-American sportspeople